Superficial branch may refer to:

 Superficial branch of ulnar nerve
 Superficial branch of radial nerve
 Superficial branch of lateral plantar nerve
 Superficial palmar branch of radial artery
 Superficial branch of medial circumflex femoral artery
 Superficial branch of transverse cervical artery